Charles Hector Congdon (29 August 1891 in Ireland Island, Sandys Parish, Bermuda – 11 January 1958 in Boughton Street, Kent, England) was an English cricketer. A right-handed batsman, he played nine first-class matches for the Royal Navy between 1921 and 1929.

Career
Charles Congdon made his first-class debut for the Royal Navy at Lord's in June 1921 against the Army. He played in the fixture again in 1922, 1923 and 1925. In 1926, he played for the Straits Settlements against the Federated Malay States, playing again in the fixture the following year, a year in which he also played for Malaya against Shanghai and Hong Kong.

Back in England, he played two first-class matches for the Royal Navy against the Army and the RAF in 1928, and played against those two teams and the Marylebone Cricket Club (MCC) in 1929. He played for the MCC against Ireland in Dublin in 1932.

References

1891 births
1958 deaths
English cricketers
Royal Navy cricketers
People from Sandys Parish
Bermudian cricketers
People from Boughton under Blean
British people in British Malaya